Berlin to Broadway with Kurt Weill is a musical revue with a book by Gene Lerner, music by Kurt Weill, and lyrics by various songwriting partners Weill worked with over his career. The plot follows Weill's life as he begins his career in Germany writing the music for controversial musicals, through his journey fleeing Nazi persecution, immigrating to the United States, and becoming successful on Broadway. Songs featured include those Weill collaborated on with Maxwell Anderson, Marc Blitzstein, Bertolt Brecht, Jacques Deval, Michael Feingold, Ira Gershwin, Paul Green, Langston Hughes, Alan Jay Lerner, Ogden Nash, George Tabori and Arnold Weinstein.

Song List
The Threepenny Opera (medley)
How to Survive
Barbara Song
Jealousy Duet
Useless Song (reprise)
Mack the Knife (Moritat)
How to Survive (reprise)
Happy End (medley)
March Ahead to the Fight
Don't Be Afraid
Bilbao Song
Surabaya Johnny
Childhood's Bright Endeavor
Mandalay Song
Rise and Fall of the City of Mahagonny (medley)
Alabama Song
Deep in Alaska
Oh, Heavenly Salvation
As You Make Your Bed
Pirate Jenny (from The Threepenny Opera)

I Wait For a Ship (from )

Sailor Tango (Happy End)

Johnny Johnson (medley)
Songs of War and Peace
A Hymn to Peace
Listen to My Song (Johnny's Song)
Knickerbocker Holiday (medley)
How Can You Tell an American
September Song
Lady in the Dark (medley)
Girl of the Moment
Saga of Jenny
My Ship
One Touch of Venus (medley)
Speak Low
That's Him

Progress (from Love Life)

Street Scene (medley)
Ain't It Awful the Heat?
Lonely House
Lost in the Stars (medley)
Trouble Man
Train to Johannesburg
Cry, the Beloved Country
Lost in the Stars
Love Song (from Love Life)

Moritat (Reprise)

Productions
The revue premiered off-Broadway on October 1, 1972 at the Theater de Lys, starring Margery Cohen, Ken Kercheval, Judy Lander, Jerry Lanning, and Hal Watters. Eileen Barett and Hal Robinson were the understudies.  It was directed by Donald Saddler, conducted by Newton Wayland, with William Glenn operating the follow spots and ran for 152 performances before closing on February 11, 1973. When the show premiered, Christopher Street was renamed "Kurt Weill-Strauss" for an hour to honor Weill's legacy and lasting impact on off-Broadway theatre.

The first off-Broadway revival opened August 19, 2000 at the Triad Theatre and closed on December 3, 2000 after 121 performances. Hal Simmons directed, with Eric Stern as musical director, and the cast included Lorinda Lisitza, Bjorn Olsson, Veronica Mittenzwei and Michael Winther.

References

Revues
1972 musicals
Off-Broadway musicals
Kurt Weill tribute albums